Bruce Hendricks is an American film director and film producer.

Filmography as director
Ultimate X: The Movie (2002)
Hannah Montana & Miley Cyrus: Best of Both Worlds Concert (2008)
Jonas Brothers: The 3D Concert Experience (2009)

Filmography as Executive Producer
Pearl Harbor (2001)
Pirates of the Caribbean: The Curse of the Black Pearl (2003)
Pirates of the Caribbean: Dead Man's Chest (2006)
Hannah Montana & Miley Cyrus: Best of Both Worlds Concert (2008)
 Pirates of the Caribbean 6 (TBA)

References

External links 

Living people
American film directors
Year of birth missing (living people)